Philip II may refer to:

 Philip II of Macedon (382–336 BC)
 Philip II (emperor) (238–249), Roman emperor
 Philip II, Prince of Taranto (1329–1374)
 Philip II, Duke of Burgundy (1342–1404)
 Philip II, Duke of Savoy (1438-1497)
 Philip II of France (1165–1223)
 Philip II of Navarre (1293–1322)
 Philip II of Spain (1527–1598)
 Philip II of Portugal (1578–1621)
 Philip II Philoromaeus (65–64 BC)

Other uses
 Philip II (hospital), in the Republic of North Macedonia
 Walls of Philip II, the City Walls built by Philip II of Spain in Madrid

See also 
 Philippe II (disambiguation)

de:Liste der Herrscher namens Philipp#Philipp II.